Rúben Miguel Valente Fonseca (born 24 February 2000) is a Portuguese professional footballer who plays for C.D. Tondela as a forward.

Club career
Born in Sanfins (Santa Maria da Feira), Fonseca played youth football for three clubs, including S.L. Benfica from ages 12 to 16. On 23 May 2019, after leading all scorers in the junior championship with 20 goals, the 19-year-old signed his first professional contract with C.D. Tondela.

Fonseca made his competitive debut with the first team on 3 August 2019, coming on as a second-half substitute in a 1–0 away loss against F.C. Penafiel in the second round of the Taça da Liga. He first appeared in the Primeira Liga the following 5 January, featuring 17 minutes in the 1–1 home draw with Gil Vicente FC.

On 5 January 2021, Fonseca was loaned to third division club S.C. Salgueiros until the end of the season. One year later, also on loan, he joined S.C. Braga B of the same league.

References

External links

2000 births
Living people
Sportspeople from Santa Maria da Feira
Portuguese footballers
Association football forwards
Primeira Liga players
Liga Portugal 2 players
Campeonato de Portugal (league) players
C.D. Tondela players
S.C. Salgueiros players
S.C. Braga B players